The 1940 United States presidential election in Massachusetts took place on November 5, 1940, as part of the 1940 United States presidential election, which was held throughout all contemporary 48 states. Voters chose 17 representatives, or electors to the Electoral College, who voted for president and vice president.

Massachusetts voted for the Democratic nominee, incumbent President Franklin D. Roosevelt of New York, over the Republican nominee, corporate lawyer Wendell Willkie of New York.  Roosevelt ran with Secretary of Agriculture Henry A. Wallace of Iowa, while Willkie’s running mate was Senate Minority Leader Charles L. McNary of Oregon.

Roosevelt carried the state with 53.11% of the vote to Willkie’s 46.36%, a Democratic victory margin of 6.75%. 

As Roosevelt was re-elected nationally to an unprecedented third term, Massachusetts weighed in as about 3% more Republican than the national average.  Roosevelt’s win may have been aided by support in New England for aid to Britain during World War Two, as he maintained his votes better among those of English descent than the German-American populations of the interior.

Once a typical Yankee Republican bastion in the wake of the Civil War, Massachusetts had been a Democratic-leaning state since 1928, when a coalition of Irish Catholic and other ethnic immigrant voters primarily based in urban areas turned Massachusetts and neighboring Rhode Island into New England's only reliably Democratic states.  Massachusetts voted for Al Smith in 1928, and for Franklin Roosevelt in his national Democratic landslides of 1932 and 1936. Roosevelt’s 1940 victory thus marked the fourth straight win for the Democratic Party in Massachusetts, a state that had voted Democratic only once in its history prior to this series of consecutive Democratic wins.

Roosevelt and Willkie would split the state's 14 counties, winning 7 counties each. However Roosevelt won the most heavily populated parts of the state including the cities of Boston, Worcester, and Springfield, while most of Willkie’s wins were small or island counties.

Results

Results by county

See also
 United States presidential elections in Massachusetts

References

Massachusetts
1940
1940 Massachusetts elections